Major's pine vole (Microtus majori) is a species of rodent in the family Cricetidae found in Caucasus region and its vicinities (Russia, Georgia, Azerbaijan, Armenia, Turkey, Iran).

References

Microtus
Mammals described in 1906
Taxa named by Oldfield Thomas